Elisabeth of Brunswick-Lüneburg (11 September 1494 in Celle – 2 April 1572 in Geldern) was a Duchess of Brunswick-Lüneburg by birth and by marriage Duchess of Guelders.

Life 
Elizabeth was a daughter of Duke Henry I of Brunswick-Luneburg (1468-1532) from his marriage to Margaret ( 1469-1528), daughter of Elector Ernest of Saxony.

She married on 7 December 1518 in Celle to Charles II, Duke of Guelders (1467-1538). In the marriage contract Charles had kept open the line of succession in Lorraine.  Elisabeth was promised a jointure consisting of the distring and city of Geldern, plus an annual pensionof 4000 gold guilders.  The marriage remained childless.  On 1528 in Gorinchem, Charles II of Guelders reached a compromise with Emperor Charles V: Charles II would retain the Duchy of Guelders for the rest of his life, however, when he died, Charles V would inherit the Duchy.

Elisabeth survived her husband by 34 years.  She resided at her wittum in Geldern.  As a devote Catholic, she supported her local parish church and the church in neighbouring Kerken generously, with monetary gifts and gifts in kind.  In 1566, she suppressed an attempt to introduce the Reformation in her territory.

She died in Geldern on 2 April 1572 and was buried under the high altar of her parish church.  A grave monument had been planned during her lifetime, however, it was not completed.

Ancestors

References 
 Wilhelm J. J. Böhmer: Elisabeth von Braunschweig-Lüneburg: die letzte Herzogin von Geldern (1494-1572): nach archivalischen Quellen, in Veröffentlichungen des Historischen Vereins für Geldern und Umgegend, 1915
 Friedrich Nettesheim: Geschichte der Stadt und des Amtes Geldern, vol. 1, Kühler, 1863, p. 218 and 235 ff
 Johannes Stinner and Karl-Heinz Tekath: Herzogtum Geldern, vol. 1, Verlag des Historischen Vereins für Geldern und Umgegend, 2001, p. 63

Footnotes 

1494 births
1572 deaths
Elisabeth
16th-century German people
Elisabeth
Daughters of monarchs